Weymouthia is a genus of two species belonging to the feather mosses. 
Weymouthia occurs in southern South America, New Zealand and south-eastern Australia and Lord Howe Island. It is characterised by (i) its monopodial, often hanging growth form; (ii) slight differences between stem and branch leaves; and (iii) the straight perichaetial leaves. In contrast to other genera in the Lembophyllaceae, secondary stems appear unable to arch back to the substrate and then root and form a new creeping stem.

Etymology 
Weymouthia was named in honour of William Anderson Weymouth (1842–1932), a prominent Tasmanian botanist. The species epithet mollis meaning soft, flabby, weak or feeble in Latin, refers to the exclusively hanging branches in this species. The species epithet cochlearifolia refers to the spoon-shaped leaves that resemble those of scurvy-grass.

Taxonomy 
Weymouthia has traditionally been assigned to the Meteoriaceae, mainly because of the hanging branches. Later the genus was included in the Lembophyllaceae, but according to recent cladistic analyses based on DNA, this family is polyphyletic, and its revision is to be expected.

Key to the species

Links to photos 
 Weymouthia mollis
 Weymouthia cochlearifolia

References

Lembophyllaceae
Flora of Australia
Flora of New Zealand
Flora of Chile
Flora of Argentina
Moss genera